Ricardo "Ricky" Ruiz (born November 4, 1996) is an American professional soccer player who currently plays for Rio Grande Valley FC in USL Championship.

Career

College & Amateur
Ruiz played four years of college soccer at the University of California, Riverside between 2014 and 2017. During his time with the Highlanders, Ruiz made 75 appearances, scoring 6 goals and tallying 12 assists.

During and after his time at college, Ruiz also appeared for clubs in the USL League Two, including FC Golden State Force in 2017 and 2019, and for Orange County SC U23 in 2018.

Professional
Ruiz signed his first professional contract in September 2019, joining NISA side Los Angeles Force ahead of their inaugural season. He scored 2 goals in 7 appearances for LA Force during the regular season and play-offs.

On January 27, 2020, Ruiz signed with USL League One side Chattanooga Red Wolves.

Ruiz made the move to USL Championship side Rio Grande Valley FC on February 23, 2022.

References

External links
 
 

1996 births
Living people
People from Lake Elsinore, California
American soccer players
American sportspeople of Mexican descent
Association football forwards
UC Riverside Highlanders men's soccer players
Orange County SC U-23 players
FC Golden State Force players
Los Angeles Force players
Chattanooga Red Wolves SC players
Rio Grande Valley FC Toros players
Soccer players from California
Sportspeople from Riverside County, California
National Independent Soccer Association players
USL League One players
USL League Two players